The Desire the Right Party (DRP) was a political party in the Falkland Islands, one of the only political parties in the history of the Falklands, which has traditionally acted as a non-partisan democracy. The other party that existed in the islands was the National Progressive Party, founded on 24 July 1964 and active for a brief time in the 1960s.

History 
The party was founded in 1987 under the initiative from Brook Hardcastle and Robert Pitaluga, local farm entrepreneurs. The party's Constitution was approved in December 1988.

The name of the party is derived from the motto of the Falklands. The party proposed to maintain the sovereignty under British sphere of influence but allowing more autonomy, and advocated limited rapprochement with Argentina but received little support from the Falkland Islanders with its candidates not winning any seats in the Legislative Council of the Falkland Islands in the two general elections the party contested.

The party made a sort of primary election to define the candidates it should present to the 1989 general election.

Election results

References 

1987 establishments in the Falkland Islands
1996 disestablishments in the Falkland Islands
Defunct political parties in the Falkland Islands
Political parties established in 1987
Political parties disestablished in 1996
Conservative parties in British Overseas Territories